Boydson Howard Baird (December 12, 1918 – January 24, 2010) was the head coach for the William & Mary Tribe men's basketball team from 1952 to 1957. In Southern Conference play, he guided his teams to a cumulative 35–41 record. Overall, Baird finished 51–73 in his five seasons as coach.

Head coaching record

Basketball

References

1918 births
2010 deaths
American men's basketball players
Basketball coaches from Ohio
Basketball players from Ohio
College men's track and field athletes in the United States
Davidson Wildcats men's basketball coaches
Indiana University alumni 
Maryville Scots athletic directors
Maryville Scots baseball coaches
Maryville Scots baseball players
Maryville Scots football coaches
Maryville Scots football players
Maryville Scots men's basketball coaches
Maryville Scots men's basketball players
Ohio Wesleyan University alumni 
Sportspeople from Knoxville, Tennessee
William & Mary Tribe football coaches
William & Mary Tribe men's basketball coaches
Basketball players from Knoxville, Tennessee
Players of American football from Knoxville, Tennessee